The 1981 Seattle Mariners season was their fifth since the franchise creation, and were 6th in the American League West at . Due to the 1981 player's strike, the season was split in half, with pre-strike and post-strike results. The strike began on June 12 and regular season play resumed on August 10.

Manager Maury Wills was fired on May 6 with a  record, the M's worst start yet; he was succeeded by 36-year-old Rene Lachemann, the manager at Triple-A Spokane.

Offseason 

 November 18, 1980: Brad Gulden was traded by the New York Yankees with $150,000 to the Mariners for a player to be named later and Larry Milbourne; the Mariners sent back Brad Gulden (May 18, 1981) to the Yankees to complete the trade. In effect, Brad Gulden was traded for himself.
 December 8, 1980: Gary Gray was selected by the Mariners from the Cleveland Indians in the rule 5 draft.
 December 12, 1980: Byron McLaughlin was traded by the Mariners to the Minnesota Twins for Willie Norwood.
 December 12, 1980: Willie Horton, Larry Cox, Rick Honeycutt, Mario Mendoza, and Leon Roberts were traded by the Mariners to the Texas Rangers for Richie Zisk, Rick Auerbach, Ken Clay, Jerry Don Gleaton, Brian Allard, and Steve Finch (minors).
 March 26, 1981: Dave Heaverlo was released.
 March 26, 1981: Willie Norwood was released.

Regular season

Overview
On January 14, 1981, the Mariners' were sold to George Argyros, a California real estate developer, for an estimated $12.5 million. The sale of the team, which needed the approval of 10 of 14 owners of American League teams, received a unanimous vote of consent on January 29.

On April 25, Mariners' manager Maury Wills advised the Kingdome groundskeepers to enlarge the batter's box by a foot (0.3 m), and A's manager Billy Martin noticed. Martin felt that batters being able to move up a foot in the box could cut at pitches before a curveball broke. Wills was suspended for two games and fined $500; he was fired on May 6.

While in Arlington in late May to play the Texas Rangers, the Mariners' uniforms were stolen. For the May 30 game against the Rangers, Seattle wore their batting practice jerseys, Milwaukee Brewers' caps, and Rangers' batting helmets. The Mariners purchased the Brewers caps at the Rangers' souvenir-stand; the Rangers did not offer Seattle caps for sale.

Journeyman Tom Paciorek put together a career season with the M's in 1981. Playing full-time for the only time in his career at age 34, he batted .326, second in the American League, and was fourth in the AL in slugging percentage. Paciorek earned his only appearance to an All-Star team in 1981 and was tenth in the AL MVP race. After a request for increased compensation and a three-year contract, the Mariners traded him in December 1981 to the Chicago White Sox for three players, none of whom made an impact with Seattle. Paciorek hit over .300 his first two years with the Sox, and was part of Chicago's division championship team in 1983.

Season standings

Record vs. opponents

Notable transactions 
 April 8: Manny Sarmiento was traded by the Mariners to the Boston Red Sox for Dick Drago.
 April 8: Bob Galasso was signed as a free agent by the Mariners.
 June 8: 1981 Major League Baseball Draft
Phil Bradley was selected by the Mariners in the third round.
Charlie O'Brien was selected by the Mariners in the 21st round, but did not sign.

Roster

Player stats

Batting

Starters by position 
Note: Pos = Position; G = Games played; AB = At bats; H = Hits; Avg. = Batting average; HR = Home runs; RBI = Runs batted in

Other batters 
Note: G = Games played; AB = At bats; H = Hits; Avg. = Batting average; HR = Home runs; RBI = Runs batted in

Pitching

Starting pitchers 
Note: G = Games pitched; IP = Innings pitched; W = Wins; L = Losses; ERA = Earned run average; SO = Strikeouts

Other pitchers 
Note: G = Games pitched; IP = Innings pitched; W = Wins; L = Losses; ERA = Earned run average; SO = Strikeouts

Relief pitchers 
Note: G = Games pitched; W = Wins; L = Losses; SV = Saves; ERA = Earned run average; SO = Strikeouts

Awards and records 
 Julio Cruz, American League record, Most chances accepted in one nine-inning game (18 chances on June 7, 1981)

Farm system

LEAGUE CHAMPIONS: Wausau

Notes

References 

1981 Seattle Mariners at Baseball Reference
1981 Seattle Mariners team page at www.baseball-almanac.com

Seattle Mariners seasons
Seattle Mariners season
Seattle Mariners